Mossige is a surname. Notable people with the surname include:

Erling Mossige (1907–1997), Norwegian jurist and banker
Svein Mossige (born 1949), Norwegian psychologist